The southern dark newtonia (Newtonia lavarambo) is a species of bird in the family Vangidae. It is endemic to the montane forests of southeastern Madagascar, from Andringitra south to Tolagnaro. It was formerly considered a population of the dark newtonia (N.  amphichroa) (now referred to as the northern dark newtonia), but was split from it in 2018 and classified as a distinct species after an analysis of physical and genetic differences from N.  amphichroa, most notably its longer tail. However, some authorities such as The Clements Checklist of Birds of the World have supported tentatively classifying N. lavarambo as a subspecies of N. amphichroa rather than a distinct species.

References 

southern dark newtonia
southern dark newtonia
Endemic birds of Madagascar